This is a list of mammal species recorded in Japan (excluding domesticated and captive populations). Of the 172 species of mammal found—112 native terrestrial mammals (those that are endemic are identified below; this number includes 37 species of bat), 19 introduced species, 40 species of Cetacea, and the dugong—161 are listed for the Japan region on the IUCN Red List of Threatened Species: of these, four taxa are critically endangered (Iriomote cat, Muennink's spiny rat, Yanbaru whiskered bat, and Gloomy tube-nosed bat), twenty-one are endangered, eight are vulnerable, and ten are near threatened; the Japanese sea lion and Bonin or Sturdee's pipistrelle are evaluated as extinct. Although on a global level the grey wolf is assessed as least concern, the two Japanese subspecies, Hokkaido wolf and Japanese wolf, are further recent extinctions; the 2020 Japanese Ministry of the Environment Red List also lists as extinct the Okinawa flying fox and Japanese river otter, as well as the subspecies .

The following tags are used to highlight each species' conservation status as assessed by the International Union for Conservation of Nature:

Order: Sirenia (manatees and dugongs) 

Sirenia is an order of fully aquatic, herbivorous mammals that inhabit rivers, estuaries, coastal marine waters, swamps, and marine wetlands. All four species are endangered.

Family: Dugongidae
Genus: Dugong
 Dugong, Dugong dugon  (MOE: CR)(northern Okinawa Island; the northernmost population globally; designated a Natural Monument under the Law for the Protection of Cultural Properties)

Order: Primates 

The order Primates contains humans and their closest relatives: lemurs, lorisoids, monkeys, and apes.

Suborder: Haplorhini
Infraorder: Simiiformes
Parvorder: Catarrhini
Superfamily: Cercopithecoidea
Family: Cercopithecidae (Old World monkeys)
Genus: Macaca
 Japanese macaque, Macaca fuscata (Honshū, Shikoku, Kyūshū, and adjacent smaller islands; the Aomori population are the northernmost non-human primates; several populations and/or related habitats have been designated Natural Monuments, including those on the Shimokita Peninsula)
 Formosan rock macaque, Macaca cyclopis (introduced species; those on the Shimokita Peninsula were removed in 2004)
 Rhesus macaque, Macaca mulatta (feral individuals observed on the Bōsō Peninsula in Chiba

Order: Rodentia (rodents) 

Rodents make up the largest order of mammals, with over 40% of mammalian species. They have two incisors in the upper and lower jaw which grow continually and must be kept short by gnawing.

Suborder: Hystricomorpha
Family: Echimyidae (spiny rats)
Subfamily: Echimyinae
Genus: Myocastor
 Coypu, Myocastor coypus (introduced from South America)
 Suborder: Myomorpha
Family: Cricetidae (hamsters, voles, lemmings, and New World rats and mice)
Subfamily: Arvicolinae
Genus: Microtus
 Japanese grass vole, Microtus montebelli (endemic;  Honshū, Kyūshū, Sado Island, Notojima)
Genus: Myodes
 Grey red-backed vole, Myodes rufocanus (Hokkaidō and adjacent smaller islands)

 Hokkaido red-backed vole, Myodes rex (Hokkaidō and adjacent smaller islands)
 Mountain red-backed vole, Myodes rex montanus (MOE: NT)(Hokkaidō and adjacent smaller islands)
 Rishiri red-backed vole, Myodes rex rex (MOE: NT)(Rishiri Island)
 Northern red-backed vole, Myodes rutilus (Hokkaidō)
 Japanese red-backed vole, Myodes andersoni (endemic; central and northern Honshū)
 Smith's red-backed vole, Myodes smithii (endemic;  Honshū, Shikoku, Kyūshū)
Genus: Ondatra
Muskrat, Ondatra zibethicus (introduced from North America)
Family: Muridae (mice, rats, gerbils, etc.)
Subfamily: Murinae
Genus: Apodemus
 Striped field mouse, Apodemus agrarius  (MOE: CR)(Uotsuri Island)
 Korean field mouse, Apodemus peninsulae (Hokkaidō)
 Large Japanese field mouse, Apodemus speciosus (widely distributed; not found in Okinawa)
 Small Japanese field mouse, Apodemus argenteus (widely distributed; not found in Okinawa)
Genus: Tokudaia
 Muennink's spiny rat, Tokudaia muenninki  (MOE: CR)(endemic to Okinawa Island; Natural Monument)
 Ryukyu spiny rat, Tokudaia osimensis  (MOE: EN)(endemic to Amami Ōshima; Natural Monument)
 Tokunoshima spiny rat, Tokudaia tokunoshimensis  (MOE: EN)(endemic to Tokunoshima; Natural Monument)
Genus: Diplothrix
 Ryukyu long-tailed giant rat, Diplothrix legata  (MOE: EN)(endemic to Amami Ōshima, Tokunoshima, and Okinawa Island; Natural Monument)
Genus: Rattus
 Brown rat, Rattus norvegicus (concentrated in urban areas)

 Polynesian rat, Rattus exulans (introduced onto Miyako Island)
 Tanezumi rat, Rattus tanezumi (concentrated in urban areas)
Genus: Micromys
 Harvest mouse, Micromys minutus (not found in Hokkaidō, Tōhoku, Okinawa)
Genus: Mus
 Ryukyu mouse, Mus caroli (Okinawa Island)
 House mouse, Mus musculus (widely distributed; commensal with humans)
Suborder: Sciuromorpha
Family: Sciuridae (squirrels)
Subfamily: Sciurinae
Tribe: Sciurini
Genus: Sciurus
 Eurasian red squirrel, Sciurus vulgaris 
 , Sciurus vulgaris orientis(Hokkaidō)
 Japanese squirrel, Sciurus lis (endemic; Honshū and Shikoku; no recent records from Kyūshū or Awaji Island)
Tribe: Pteromyini
Genus: Petaurista
 Japanese giant flying squirrel, Petaurista leucogenys (endemic; Honshū, Shikoku, and Kyūshū)
Genus: Pteromys
 Japanese dwarf flying squirrel, Pteromys momonga (endemic; Honshū, Shikoku, Kyūshū)
 Siberian flying squirrel, Pteromys volans (found on Hokkaidō, as P. v. orii)
Siberian flying squirrel, Pteromys volans orii(Hokkaidō)
Subfamily: Callosciurinae
Tribe: Callosciurini
Genus: Callosciurus
 Pallas's squirrel, Callosciurus erythraeus (introduced; naturalized populations from Ibaraki to Miyazaki)
Subfamily: Xerinae
Tribe: Marmotini
Genus: Tamias
 Siberian chipmunk, Tamias sibiricus (Hokkaidō and adjacent smaller islands)
 Ezo chipmunk, Tamias sibiricus lineatus (MOE: DD)
Family: Gliridae (dormice)
Subfamily: Glirinae
Genus: Glirulus
 Japanese dormouse, Glirulus japonicus (endemic; Honshū, Shikoku, Kyūshū, Dōgojima; Natural Monument)

Order: Lagomorpha (hares, rabbits, and pikas) 

The lagomorphs comprise two families, Leporidae (hares and rabbits), and Ochotonidae (pikas). Though they can resemble rodents, and were classified as a superfamily in that order until the early 20th century, they have since been considered a separate order. They differ from rodents in a number of physical characteristics, such as having four incisors in the upper jaw rather than two.

Family: Leporidae (hares and rabbits)
Genus: Lepus
 Japanese hare, Lepus brachyurus (endemic; Honshū, Shikoku, Kyūshū, and adjacent smaller islands)
 Sado hare, Lepus brachyurus lyoni (MOE: NT)(Sado Island)
 Mountain hare, Lepus timidus (Hokkaidō, Kunashiri, Etorofu)
, Lepus timidus ainu(Hokkaidō)
Genus: Oryctolagus
 European rabbit, Oryctolagus cuniculus (introduced; feral on thirteen islands)
Genus: Pentalagus
 Amami rabbit, Pentalagus furnessi  (MOE: EN)(endemic to Amami Ōshima and Tokunoshima; Special Natural Monument)
Family: Ochotonidae (pikas)
Genus: Ochotona
 Northern pika, Ochotona hyperborea 
 , Ochotona hyperborea yesoensis (MOE: NT)(Hokkaidō)

Order: Eulipotyphla (hedgehogs, shrews, and moles) 

Eulipotyphlans are insectivorous mammals. Shrews and solenodons resemble mice, hedgehogs carry spines, gymnures look more like large rats, while moles are stout-bodied burrowers.

Family: Erinaceidae (hedgehogs and moonrats)
Subfamily: Erinaceinae
Genus: Erinaceus
 Amur hedgehog, Erinaceus amurensis (introduced; populations in the Odawara area and on the Izu Peninsula)
Family: Soricidae (shrews)
Subfamily: Crocidurinae
Genus: Crocidura
 Asian lesser white-toothed shrew, Crocidura shantungensis  (MOE: NT)(Tsushima Island)

 Watase's shrew, Crocidura watasei  (MOE: NT)(endemic to the Ryūkyū Islands)

 Dsinezumi shrew, Crocidura dsinezumi (from Hokkaidō to Kagoshima; also Jeju Island)
 Orii's shrew, Crocidura orii  (MOE: EN)(endemic to the Amami Islands)
Genus: Suncus
 House shrew, Suncus murinus (Ryūkyū Islands, Fukue Island, Kyūshū (Nagasaki, Kagoshima))
Subfamily: Soricinae
Tribe: Nectogalini
Genus: Chimarrogale

 Japanese water shrew, Chimarrogale platycephalus (endemic; Honshū and Kyūshū)
Tribe: Soricini
Genus: Sorex
 Slender shrew, Sorex gracillimus (Hokkaidō and adjacent smaller islands)
 Azumi shrew, Sorex hosonoi  (MOE: NT)(endemic; central Honshū)
 Eurasian least shrew, Sorex minutissimus 
 , Sorex minutissimus hawkeri (MOE: VU)(Hokkaidō, Kenbokki Island, Kunashiri)

 Shinto shrew, Sorex shinto (endemic; subspecies on Honshū, Sado Island, and Shikoku)
 Shikoku shrew, Sorex shinto shikokensis (MOE: NT)(Shikoku)
 Laxmann's shrew, Sorex caecutiens (Hokkaidō, Kunashiri)
 Long-clawed shrew, Sorex unguiculatus (Hokkaidō and adjacent smaller islands)
Family: Talpidae (moles)
Subfamily: Talpinae
Tribe: Talpini
Genus: Euroscaptor
 Japanese mountain mole, Euroscaptor mizura  (MOE: NT)(endemic; Honshū)
Genus: Mogera
 Small Japanese mole, Mogera imaizumii (endemic; Honshū, Shikoku, and adjacent smaller islands)
 Japanese mole, Mogera wogura (endemic; southern Honshū, Shikoku, Kyūshū, and adjacent smaller islands)

 Echigo mole, Mogera etigo  (MOE: EN)(endemic; Niigata)
 Sado mole, Mogera tokudae  (MOE: NT)(endemic to Sado Island)
 Senkaku mole, Mogera uchidai  (MOE: CR)(endemic to Uotsuri Island)
Tribe: Urotrichini
Genus: Urotrichus
 True's shrew mole, Dymecodon pilirostris (endemic; Honshū, Shikoku, Kyūshū)
 Japanese shrew mole, Urotrichus talpoides (endemic; Honshū, Shikoku, Kyūshū, and adjacent smaller islands)

Order: Chiroptera (bats) 

The bats' most distinguishing feature is that their forelimbs are developed as wings, making them the only mammals capable of flight. Bat species account for about 20% of all mammals.

Family: Pteropodidae (flying foxes, Old World fruit bats)
Subfamily: Pteropodinae
Genus: Pteropus
 Ryukyu flying fox, Pteropus dasymallus (Ryūkyū Islands)
 Daito flying fox, Pteropus dasymallus daitoensis (MOE: CR)(Daitō Islands; Natural Monument)
 Erabu flying fox, Pteropus dasymallus dasymallus (MOE: CR)(Ōsumi Islands and Tokara Islands)
 Okinawa flying fox, Pteropus loochoensis  (MOE: EX)(not found since a C19 record)
 Bonin flying fox, Pteropus pselaphon  (MOE: EN)(endemic to Bonin Islands and Volcano Islands)
Family: Hipposideridae
Genus: Hipposideros
 Lesser great leaf-nosed bat, Hipposideros turpis (endemic to Yaeyama Islands)
Family: Rhinolophidae
Genus: Rhinolophus
 Greater horseshoe bat, Rhinolophus ferrumequinum (widely distributed)
 Little Japanese horseshoe bat, Rhinolophus cornutus (endemic; widely distributed)
 Orii's least horseshoe bat, Rhinolophus cornutus orii (MOE: EN)(Amami Islands)
 , Rhinolophus pumilus (endemic to Okinawa)
 , Rhinolophus pumilus pumilus (MOE: EN)(Okinawa)
 , Rhinolophus pumilus miyakonis (MOE: EX)(Miyako Island)
 Yaeyama little horseshoe bat, Rhinolophus perditus  (MOE: VU)(endemic to the Yaeyama Islands)
 Imaizumi's horseshoe bat, Rhinolophus perditus imaizumii(Iriomote)
Family: Molossidae
Genus: Tadarida
 East Asian free-tailed bat, Tadarida insignis  (MOE: VU)(not found in Okinawa)

 La Touche's free-tailed bat, Tadarida latouchei  (MOE: DD)(Amami Islands, Kuchinoerabu-jima)
Family: Miniopteridae
Genus: Miniopterus
 Eastern bent-wing bat, Miniopterus fuliginosus (Honshū, Shikoku, Kyūshū, and adjacent smaller islands)

 Southeast Asian long-fingered bat, Miniopterus fuscus  (MOE: EN)(endemic to Ryūkyū Islands)
Family: Vespertilionidae
Subfamily: Vespertilioninae
Genus: Eptesicus
 Japanese short-tailed bat, Eptesicus japonensis  (MOE: VU)(endemic; central Honshū)
 Northern bat, Eptesicus nilssoni (Hokkaidō, Kunashiri, Etorofu)
Genus: Nyctalus
 Birdlike noctule, Nyctalus aviator  (MOE: VU)(widely distributed)
 Japanese noctule, Nyctalus furvus  (MOE: EN)(endemic; central and northern Honshū)

Genus: Pipistrellus
 Japanese pipistrelle, Pipistrellus abramus (widely distributed)
 Endo's pipistrelle, Pipistrellus endoi  (MOE: VU)(endemic; Honshū and Shikoku)
 Sturdee's pipistrelle, Pipistrellus sturdeei  (MOE: EX)(endemic; not found since the type specimen was collected on Hahajima in 1915)
Genus: Barbastella
 Asian barbastelle, Barbastella leucomelas 
 Eastern barbastelle, Barbastella leucomelas darielingensis(Hokkaidō, Kunashiri, Honshū and Shikoku)
Genus: Plecotus
 Japanese long-eared bat, Plecotus sacrimontis (endemic; not found in Okinawa)
Genus: Hypsugo
 Alashanian pipistrelle, Hypsugo alaschanicus  (MOE: DD)(found in Hokkaidō and Aomori, and on Tsushima Island)
 Savi's pipistrelle, Hypsugo savii 
Genus: Vespertilio
 Particoloured bat, Vespertilio murinus  (MOE: DD)(found in Hokkaidō, Aomori, and Ishikawa)
 Asian particoloured bat, Vespertilio sinensis (widely distributed; not found in Okinawa)
Subfamily: Myotinae
Genus: Myotis

 Red and black Myotis, Myotis rufoniger  (MOE: CR) (as Hodgson's bat, Myotis formosus)(found on Tsushima)
 Fraternal myotis, Myotis frater (north from Gifu)

 Ussuri whiskered bat, Myotis gracilis  (as Siberian bat Myotis sibiricus) (MOE: VU)(Hokkaidō, Kunashiri, Etorofu)
 Ikonnikov's bat, Myotis ikonnikovi (Hokkaidō, Kunashiri, Honshū)

 Big-footed myotis, Myotis macrodactylus (widely distributed)
 Far Eastern myotis, Myotis bombinus  (MOE: VU) (as Myotis nattereri bombinus)(widely distributed; not found in Okinawa)
 Eastern water bat, Myotis petax (Hokkaidō, Kunashiri, Etorofu)
 Frosted myotis, Myotis pruinosus  (MOE: VU)(endemic; Honshū, Shikoku, Kyūshū)
 Yanbaru whiskered bat, Myotis yanbarensis  (MOE: CR)(endemic to Ryūkyū Islands)

Subfamily: Murininae
Genus: Murina
 Hilgendorf's tube-nosed bat, Murina hilgendorfi (widely distributed; not found in Okinawa)
 Ryukyu tube-nosed bat, Murina ryukyuana  (MOE: EN)(endemic to Ryūkyū Islands)
 Gloomy tube-nosed bat, Murina tenebrosa  (MOE: DD)(endemic; not found since the type specimen was collected on Tsushima Island in 1962)
 Ussuri tube-nosed bat, Murina ussuriensis (widely distributed; not found in Okinawa)

Order: Cetacea (whales) 

The order Cetacea includes whales, dolphins and porpoises. They are the mammals most fully adapted to aquatic life with a spindle-shaped nearly hairless body, protected by a thick layer of blubber, and forelimbs and tail modified to provide propulsion underwater.

Suborder: Mysticeti
Family: Balaenidae

Genus: Eubalaena
 North Pacific right whale, Eubalaena japonica 
Family: Balaenopteridae
Subfamily: Balaenopterinae
Genus: Balaenoptera
 Common minke whale, Balaenoptera acutorostrata 
 Sei whale, Balaenoptera borealis 
 Bryde's whale, Balaenoptera edeni 
 Omura's whale, Balaenoptera omurai 
 Blue whale, Balaenoptera musculus (no recent records in neighbouring waters)
 Fin whale, Balaenoptera physalus 
Subfamily: Megapterinae
Genus: Megaptera
 Humpback whale, Megaptera novaeangliae (regular sightings in the Ogasawara Islands and Okinawa)
Family: Eschrichtiidae
Genus: Eschrichtius
 Grey whale, Eschrichtius robustus (occasional sightings of western subpopulation )
Suborder: Odontoceti
Superfamily: Platanistoidea
Family: Monodontidae
Genus: Delphinapterus
 Beluga, Delphinapterus leucas  vagrant
Family: Phocoenidae
Genus: Neophocaena
 Narrow-ridged finless porpoise, Neophocaena asiaeorientalis 

Genus: Phocoena
 Harbour porpoise, Phocoena phocoena 
Genus: Phocoenoides
 Dall's porpoise, Phocoenoides dalli 
Family: Physeteridae
Genus: Physeter
 Sperm whale, Physeter macrocephalus 
Family: Kogiidae
Genus: Kogia
 Pygmy sperm whale, Kogia breviceps 
 Dwarf sperm whale, Kogia sima 
Family: Ziphidae
Genus: Ziphius
 Cuvier's beaked whale, Ziphius cavirostris 
Genus: Berardius
 Baird's beaked whale, Berardius bairdii 
 Sato's beaked whale, Berardius minimus 
Subfamily: Hyperoodontinae
Genus: Indopacetus
 Indo-Pacific beaked whale, Indopacetus pacificus 
Genus: Mesoplodon
 Hubbs' beaked whale, Mesoplodon carlhubbsi 
 Blainville's beaked whale, Mesoplodon densirostris 
 Ginkgo-toothed beaked whale, Mesoplodon ginkgodens 
 Stejneger's beaked whale, Mesoplodon stejnegeri 
Family: Delphinidae (marine dolphins)
Genus: Steno
 Rough-toothed dolphin, Steno bredanensis 
Genus: Tursiops
 Indo-Pacific bottlenose dolphin, Tursiops aduncus 
 Common bottlenose dolphin, Tursiops truncatus 
Genus: Stenella
 Pantropical spotted dolphin, Stenella attenuata 
 Striped dolphin, Stenella coeruleoalba 
 Spinner dolphin, Stenella longirostris (common around the Ogasawara Islands)
Genus: Delphinus
 Long-beaked common dolphin, Delphinus capensis 
 Short-beaked common dolphin, Delphinus delphis 
Genus: Lagenodelphis
 Fraser's dolphin, Lagenodelphis hosei 
Genus: Sagmatias
 Pacific white-sided dolphin, Sagmatias obliquidens 
Genus: Lissodelphis
 Northern right whale dolphin, Lissodelphis borealis 
Genus: Grampus
 Risso's dolphin, Grampus griseus 
Genus: Peponocephala
 Melon-headed whale, Peponocephala electra 
Genus: Feresa
 Pygmy killer whale, Feresa attenuata 
Genus: Pseudorca
 False killer whale, Pseudorca crassidens 
Genus: Orcinus
 Orca, Orcinus orca 
Genus: Globicephala
 Short-finned pilot whale, Globicephala macrorhynchus

Order: Carnivora (carnivorans) 

There are over 260 species of carnivorans, the majority of which feed primarily on meat. They have a characteristic skull shape and dentition. Wolves and otters are now believed to be extinct in Japan.

Suborder: Feliformia
Family: Felidae (cats)
Subfamily: Felinae
Genus: Prionailurus
 Leopard cat, P. bengalensis 
 Tsushima leopard cat [ja], P. b. euptilurus (MOE: CR)(Tsushima Island; Natural Monument)
 Iriomote cat, P. b. iriomotensis  (MOE: CR)(Iriomote; Special Natural Monument)
Genus: Lynx 
Eurasian lynx, Lynx lynx  extirpated in prehistory
Subfamily: Pantherinae
Genus: Panthera
 Leopard, Panthera pardus  extirpated in prehistory
 Tiger, P. tigris  extirpated in prehistory
Family: Viverridae (civets)
Genus: Paradoxurus
 Asian palm civet, Paradoxurus hermaphroditus LR/lc introduced
Genus: Paguma
 Masked palm civet, Paguma larvata (introduced; Honshū, Shikoku, Kyūshū, Ryukyu)
Family: Herpestidae
Genus: Urva
 Small Indian mongoose, U.  auropunctata (introduced on Okinawa Island and Amami Ōshima and in areas of the cities of Satsumasendai and Kagoshima)
Suborder: Caniformia
Family: Canidae (dogs, foxes)
Genus: Vulpes
 Red fox, V. vulpes 
 , Vulpes vulpes japonica(Honshū, Shikoku, Kyūshū)
 Ezo red fox, V. v. schrencki(Hokkaidō)
Genus: Nyctereutes
 Japanese raccoon dog, N. viverrinus (endemic; Honshū, Shikoku, Kyūshū, and adjacent smaller islands; tanuki habitat in Yamaguchi is a Natural Monument)
 , Nyctereutes viverrinus albus(Hokkaidō, Okushiri Island)
Genus: Canis
 Grey wolf, Canis lupus  extirpated
 Hokkaido wolf, C. l. hattai (Hokkaidō)
 Japanese wolf, C. l. hodophilax (Honshū, Shikoku, Kyūshū)
Family: Ursidae (bears)
Genus: Ursus
 Brown bear, U. arctos 
 Ussuri brown bear, U. a. lasiotus(Hokkaidō, Kunashiri, Etorofu)  
 Asiatic black bear, U. thibetanus 
 Japanese black bear, U. t. japonicus(Honshū and Shikoku, formerly also Kyūshū)
Family: Procyonidae (raccoons)
Genus: Procyon
 Raccoon, Procyon lotor (introduced from the Americas)
Family: Mustelidae (mustelids)
Genus: Meles
 Japanese badger, Meles anakuma (endemic; Honshū, Shikoku, Kyūshū)
Genus: Enhydra
 Sea otter, Enhydra lutris  (MOE: CR)(eastern Hokkaidō)
Genus: Lutra
 Japanese river otter, L. nippon  (last recorded on Honshū in 1954 and in Kōchi in 1979)
Genus: Martes
 Japanese marten, Martes melampus (endemic; Honshū, Shikoku, Kyūshū)
 , Martes melampus tsuensis (MOE: NT)(endemic; Tsushima Island; Natural Monument
 Sable, Martes zibellina 
 , Martes zibellina brachyura (MOE: EN)(Hokkaidō)
Genus: Mustela
 Stoat, Mustela erminea 
 , Mustela erminea nippon (MOE: NT)(central and northern Honshū)
 , Mustela erminea orientalis (MOE: NT)(Hokkaidō)
 Japanese weasel, Mustela itatsi (endemic to Honshū, Shikoku, Kyūshū, and adjacent smaller islands; introduced to Hokkaidō, Rishiri Island, Rebun Island, Ryūkyū Islands, etc, for rat control)
 Siberian weasel, Mustela sibirica  (MOE: EN)(native on Tsushima Island, introduced to western Japan)
 Least weasel, Mustela nivalis 
 , Mustela nivalis namiyei (MOE: NT)(Tōhoku)
 , Mustela nivalis nivalis(Hokkaidō)
Genus: Neogale
 American mink, Neogale vison (introduced; Hokkaidō, Nagano, Fukushima; records from elsewhere in Honshū and Kyūshū)
Family: Otariidae (eared seals, sealions)
Genus: Callorhinus
 Northern fur seal, Callorhinus ursinus (northern Japan)
Genus: Eumetopias
 Steller sea lion, Eumetopias jubatus  (MOE: NT)
 Western Steller sea lion, Eumetopias jubatus jubatus (Hokkaidō and Shimokita Peninsula)
Genus: Zalophus
 Japanese sea lion, Zalophus japonicus  (MOE: CR)(last recorded on Takeshima in 1975)
Family: Phocidae (earless seals)
Genus: Erignathus
 Bearded seal, Erignathus barbatus (Hokkaidō and vagrant)
 Pacific bearded seal, Erignathus barbatus nauticus (vagrant)
Genus: Histriophoca
 Ribbon seal, Histriophoca fasciata (northeast Hokkaidō)
Genus: Mirounga
 Northern elephant seal, Mirounga angustirostris (vagrant)
Genus: Phoca
 Spotted seal, Phoca largha (Hokkaidō)
 Harbour seal, Phoca vitulina  (MOE: NT)(Hokkaidō)
 Kuril seal, Phoca vitulina stejnegeri (eastern Hokkaidō)
Genus: Pusa
 Ringed seal, Pusa hispida (especially northern Hokkaidō)

Order: Artiodactyla (even-toed ungulates) 

The even-toed ungulates are ungulates whose weight is borne about equally by the third and fourth toes, rather than mostly or entirely by the third as in perissodactyls. There are about 220 artiodactyl species, including many that are of great economic importance to humans.

Family: Suidae (pigs)
Subfamily: Suinae
Genus: Sus
 Wild boar, Sus scrofa 
 Japanese boar, Sus scrofa leucomystax(Honshū south from Fukushima, Shikoku, Kyūshū, Awaji Island)
  Sus scrofa riukiuanus(Ryūkyū Islands; half as massive as Sus scrofa leucomystax)
Family: Cervidae (deer)
Subfamily: Cervinae
Genus: Muntiacus
 Reeves's muntjac, Muntiacus reevesi (introduced; southern Chiba and Izu Ōshima)
Genus: Cervus
 Sika deer, Cervus nippon (widely distributed; Kerama deer and their habitat, and the deer of Nara, are Natural Monuments)
Family: Bovidae (cattle, antelope, sheep, goats)
Subfamily: Caprinae
Genus: Capricornus
 Japanese serow, Capricornis crispus (endemic; Honshū, Shikoku, Kyūshū; Special Natural Monument)

See also
List of animals in Japan 
Wildlife of Japan
List of chordate orders
Lists of mammals by region
List of prehistoric mammals
Mammal classification
List of mammals described in the 2000s

References

.List
Mammals
Japan
Japan